Rest on the Flight into Egypt is a 1501–1520 oil on panel painting by Gerard David, probably originally commissioned for the Convent of Our Lady of Paradise in Évora and now in the National Museum of Ancient Art in Lisbon.

References

David
Paintings by Gerard David
1500s paintings
1510s paintings
Paintings in the collection of the National Museum of Ancient Art
Donkeys in art